Rosa Malango is an Equatorial Guinean diplomat and former journalist, who serves as United Nations Director, Regional Commissions, New York Office. In this capacity, she works with UN Regional Economic Commissions in Africa, the Americas, Asia and Europe. She  was appointed to that position, in June 2021, by António Guterres, the UN Secretary General.

Immediately before that, from March 2016 until June 2021, she was the United Nations Resident Coordinator in Uganda, based in Kampala, the country's capital and largest city.

Background and education
She is a native of Equatorial Guinea. Her father was a diplomat, part of the first mission of Equatorial Guinea to the UN, when that country was admitted to the United Nations starting in 1968.

Malango holds a Bachelor of Science degree in Mass Communication, awarded by the University of Lagos in Nigeria. She is reported to speak French, Spanish, English and Portuguese.

Career
Following her graduation from university in the early 1990s, she took up employment with the Embassy of Argentina to Nigeria as an Executive Assistant/Translator for the First Secretary at that institution. Later, she worked with STB & Associates Limited, in their advertising department.

She then left Nigeria and went to Angola in 1994, to volunteer with the United Nations Children's Fund (UNICEF), in their social and humanitarian programs in "war-torn Angola" at that time. The following year, she was hired by the United Nations Office for the Coordination of Humanitarian Affairs (OCHA), as their Chief Information Officer, in Angola. She served in that capacity for three years.

From 2002 until 2003, she was the Regional Programme Coordinator for OCHA in the Ivory Coast. She stayed in the Ivory Coast for another two years, working as the Regional Programme Adviser for the World Food Programme.

Then, there followed a ten-year period between 2005 and 2015, when Malango was based in New York City, serving as the Chief of the External Relations and Partnerships Section of OCHA. In 2015, she was on the move again, taking up assignment as Head, Resident Coordinator's Office, for the United Nations Development Program (UNDP) in Guatemala, Central America, serving there until 2016.

In 2016 she was moved to Uganda as the UN Resident Coordinator, serving a five year term in that capacity. In 2021, she relocated back to New York City to work as  Director of Regional Commissions in the New York Office. In Uganda, she was replaced by Susan Ngongi Namondo from Cameroon.

See also
 Susan Ngongi Namondo
 Melissa Mbile Sánchez

References

External links
Rosa Malango Bids Farewell To Uganda As of 10 June 2021.

Living people
Equatoguinean people
1969 births
Equatoguinean journalists
Equatoguinean women journalists
Equatoguinean diplomats
Equatoguinean women diplomats
Equatoguinean officials of the United Nations
University of Lagos alumni